Reign Storm may refer to:
 Reign Storm (Danny Phantom)
 Reign Storm (The Adventures of Super Mario Bros. 3)